Constance Lake First Nation is an Oji-Cree First Nations band government located on the shores of Constance Lake near Hearst, Cochrane District in northeastern Ontario, Canada. It is directly north of the community of Calstock along a continuation of Ontario Highway 663. Constance Lake First Nation is home to close to 1605 members of Cree and Ojibway with approximately 820 living on reserve. The reserves, Constance Lake 92 and English River 66, total  in size.

History
The Constance Lake First Nation members are of:

Mammamattawa (English River), where the Kenogami River joins with the Kabinakagami and Nagagami Rivers, was the site of Hudson's Bay Company's and rival Revillon Frères' fur trading posts. This area became the Mammamattawa (English River) Reserve which was renamed the Constance Lake First Nation (CLFN).

Constance Lake First Nation were known as the English River Band of Oji-Cree. On 27 July 1905 English River Band of Oji-Cree were attached to Treaty 9 as a subdivision of the Fort Albany First Nation on James Bay, and therefore Treaty beneficiaries.
 
By 1912, Hearst was established with the construction of the National Transcontinental Railway in 1913. Between 1908 and 1912 Hearst became a meeting place for First Nations Peoples engaged in the fur trade. Calstock National Transcontinental Railway's east–west secondary mainline connected Calstock (near Hearst) with Cochrane.

Between 1925 and 1940, many families from English River, Fort Albany, and Moose Factory re-located to Pagwa, near the present-day Constance Lake First Nation, to follow employment opportunities. Pagwa, named for the Pagwachuan River, one of the largest rivers in Northern Ontario, was valued by First Nations and the North-West fur traders, as an access, along with the Albany River, to James Bay and Hudson Bay. Pagwachuan is a Cree word meaning shallow river. Pagwa, a railway divisional point, had a fur trading post, as it was at a major junction of the railway and the Pagwachuan River. Packet steamers ran between Pagwa and James Bay to serve the Revillon Freres trading post and community early in the 1900s. In the 1930s an airfield was built in Pagwa by the Department of National Defence By May 1940 the majority of the English River First Nation resided at Pagwa as the English River reserve was "uninhabitable", according to Reverend Clarke who had requesting funding for a new school at Pagwa. In 1943 the Department of Indian Affairs began to consider the creation of a new Band for those living at Pagwa.

Inspector Arneil chose Calstock, near Constance Bay, as the most suitable location. On 21 September 1944 the government purchased land for an Indian reserve for the use and benefits of the Constance Bay First Nation, previously known as the Calstock Reserve. Arneil recommended that the Constance Lake First Nation include members of Albany and Moose Factory (Attawapiskat) Bands who also resided at Pagwa. In the 1940s, Constance Lake First Nation "absorbed essentially the whole of the English River Band and also members of the Albany and Moose Factory Bands who lived nearby."

Joan A. Lovisek grouped the Constance Bay First Nations linguistically, with the historical Moose River Cree.

Governance
The First Nation elects its leadership for a two-year term through the Act Electoral System. , the leadership is held by chief Ramona Sutherland, together with four (4) councilors: Wayne Neegan, Samantha John-George, Christine Stephen, Ricky Sutherland.

As a signatory to Treaty 9, the First Nation is a member of Matawa First Nations, a Regional Chiefs' Council; the Regional Chiefs' Council, in turn, is a member of the Nishnawbe Aski Nation, a Tribal Political Organization representing many of the First Nations in Northern and Northwestern Ontario.

Reserves
Constance Lake First Nation have two reserves: the  Constance Lake 92 Indian Reserve and the  English River 66 Indian Reserve, of which Constance Lake 92 serves as the main reserve. The community has existed in this area since the early 1940s, when the reserve was first established.

Economic development
Constance Lake First Nation is one of the nine First Nations in the mineral-rich Northern Ontario Ring of Fire area, a massive planned chromite-mining and smelting development project in the mineral-rich area of the James Bay Lowlands. Tony Clement, Canada's Treasury Board President and the FedNor minister responsible for the Ring of Fire, claimed it will be the economic equivalent of the Athabasca oil sands with a potential of generating $120 billion. Tony Clement described how the Ring of Fire will bring "about a 100 years of mining activity that will spin-off jobs and economic activity for generations." Challenges facing the development of the Ring of Fire mineral include lack of access to the remote region, infrastructure deficits such as roads, railway, electricity and broadband, First Nations' land rights and environmental issues

On 4 February 2013, Tony Clement, acknowledged that the nine first First Nations, on and off-reserve in the Ring of Fire area are some of the "most socioeconomically disadvantaged communities in all of Canada."

In an interview with CBC on 27 June 2013, Les Louttit, the deputy grand chief of the Nishnawbe Aski Nation, the group that represents the nine First Nations, argued that serious problems have been neglected for decades. Two to three years is not enough time to for skills training to train locals for construction jobs, for example. Louttit noted the gap in First Nations high school and post-secondary education that's existed for many years. Anja Jeffrey, director of the Centre for the North at the Conference Board of Canada, stressed traditional hunting as one of the key issues while .

Bob Rae was appointed as chief negotiator to represent the nine different native governments, Marten Falls First Nation, Webequie First Nation, Neskantaga First Nation, Nibinamik First Nation, Aroland First Nation, Long Lake 58 First Nation, Ginoogaming First Nation, Fort Hope (Eabametoong) First Nation, Mishkeegogamang First Nation and Constance Lake First Nation, for the Matawa First Nations in talks with the Ontario government about the opening of First Nations lands to the giant Ring of Fire mineral development. Noront's Eagle's Nest copper and nickel mine and the Black Thor chromite mine of Cliffs Natural Resources would generate wealth and royalties for Ontario but the mines are in a remote region. They will "require significant development to make them viable." "[D]evelopment that will have a profound effect on the local native communities, five of which are not yet accessible by road."

In 2002 CLFN through the Northern Boreal Initiative (NBI) began formal planning efforts to document aboriginal traditional knowledge to guide future commercial forestry opportunities. In partnership with the Ontario Ministry of Natural Resources (MNR), they are developing a frame of reference for land use and planning using Community Based Land Use Planning under the authority of the Far North Act. In March 2013 they published a draft entitled, Community Based Land Use Planning.

Lecours Lumber Company Ltd.
Lecours Lumber Company Ltd. which operates a saw mill located in Calstock on a long-term federal lease, is the main employer of the community. After months of negotiations, on 25 February 2013 Ben Lecours of Lecours Lumber Company Ltd. and Constance Lake First Nation negotiated memorandum of agreements through Regina based mediator, Kenneth Gamble regarding Lecours operations on Constance Lake First Nation. The MOAs cover "employment and training for Constance Lake members, and business opportunities for the First Nation businesses" in addition to the land "lease agreement."

Services
Constance Lake is policed by the Nishnawbe-Aski Police Service, an Aboriginal-based service.

Broadband fibre optics
By 26 March 2012 Industry Canada's Broadband Canada, the Northwestern Ontario Broadband Expansion Initiative, was already laying 2300 kilometers of fibre optic cable to 26 First Nations across the Far North including the Ring of Fire.

Education
On 10 June 2013 the Constance Lake First Nation, Ontario Works, and Contact North entered into a partnership whereby Contact North "local online learning centre will provide local on-site staff, free local access to educational technology, high-speed Internet, and computer workstations" to access a wide range of "online and distance programs and courses from Ontario's public colleges, universities, school boards, literacy and other training providers," currently available from Ontario's "publicly funded education and training providers."

Constance Lake First Nation is one of eight First Nation communities along with Aundeck Omni Kaning, M'Chigeeng, Sagamok, Sheguiandah, Sheshegwaning, Whitefish River, and Zhiibaahasing (totalling a member population of 6,800+ people), served by the Anishnaabe controlled and directed Kenjgewin Teg Educational Institute (KTEI), a non-profit incorporated organization. KTEI was formed in April 1994 with the merger of the Wautebek Training Institute and Nda-Gkenjge-Gamig Educational Institute. KTEI provides educational services that "complement First Nation's education delivery in meeting the needs of all learners in school and post-school programs".

See also
Kenjgewin Teg Educational Institute

Notes

References

Communities in Cochrane District